The Cherskii–Kolyma mountain tundra ecoregion (WWF ID: PA1103) is an ecoregion that covers the higher elevations of the Chersky Range and the Kolyma Mountains, the only large mountain range in northern Russia. It is in the Palearctic realm, and tundra biome.

Location and description 
The ecoregion encompasses terrain above 800 meters in the Chersky Range and Kolyma Mountains, in a mosaic of territory stretching 2,000 km from the Lena River in the west to the eastern edge of the Kolyma Mountains, and approximately 1,000 km from the Okhotsk Sea in the south to the coastal plain of the Arctic Sea in the north.  The highest peaks reach 3,000 meters at Peak Pobeda.

Climate 
Most of the region has a Subarctic climate - very cold (Koppen classification Dfd). Mean precipitation is about 237 mm/year.

Flora and fauna 
Only hardy species can survive year around at altitude in this ecoregion.  A few stands of larch may reach up to 1,000 meters, above that to about 1,900 meters might be found sub-alpine dwarf pine, followed by a thin zone of alpine tundra to 2,200 meters, and no plants above 2,200 meters.

Protections 
There is one significant nationally protected area that reaches into this ecoregion, the Magadan Nature Reserve, on the southern edge of the ecoregion along the sea of Okhotsk.

See also 
 List of ecoregions in Russia

References 

Ecoregions of Russia
Palearctic ecoregions
Tundra ecoregions